The Estadio Hugo Sánchez Márquez is a multi-use stadium located in Cuautitlán Izcalli, State of Mexico, Mexico.  It is currently used mostly for football matches and is the home stadium for Huracanes Izcalli & Lobos Huerta of Liga Premier FMF Serie B and Club Leon of Liga TDP.  The stadium has a capacity of 3,500 people.

References

External links

Multi-purpose stadiums in Mexico
Estadio Hugo Sánchez Márquez
Athletics (track and field) venues in Mexico